SM City Butuan is a shopping mall owned and operated by SM Prime Holdings, the largest mall owner and operator in the Philippines. It is the first SM Mall in Agusan del Norte and Caraga Region. The mall was supposed to be opened on April 17, 2020, however it was postponed due to the COVID-19 pandemic in the Philippines, and the date of it was moved to November 13, 2020. It is located at J.C. Aquino Avenue, Brgy. Lapu-Lapu, Butuan. It is the only shopping mall in the Philippines to be opened in 2020 during the pandemic.

Facilities
SM City Butuan anchor stores are SM Supermarket, The SM Store, SM Appliances, Ace Hardware, BDO, Surplus, Uniqlo, Miniso, Watsons, Sports Central, SM Cinema, and Cyberzone.

It has a 765 parking slots, including at the roof deck, bicycle lane, and a helipad.

Construction
SM City Butuan was planned in 2013. Construction was started in 2017, it has a total floor area of 37,000 square meters, and a 3 and a half stories high. The mall was completed in November 2020.

Gallery

See also
SM Supermalls
Robinsons Place Butuan
List of shopping malls in the Philippines

References

Shopping malls in the Philippines
Shopping malls established in 2020
SM Prime
Buildings and structures in Butuan